Arnold Alexander Herbert Otto Heinrich Constantin Graf von Keyserling (February 9, 1922 in Hamburg – September 7, 2005 in Matrei, Tyrol), better known as Arnold Keyserling, was a German philosopher and theologian. He was the son of Hermann von Keyserling and great-grandson of Otto von Bismarck.

See also
Bismarck family

References

External links 
keyserling-crest
Schule des Rades :: Digitale Bibliothek (Arnold Keyserling's online books in German)

1922 births
2005 deaths
Writers from Hamburg
20th-century German theologians
German male non-fiction writers
20th-century German philosophers